is a series of association football sports video games released by Sega for arcades. Originally developed by Sega AM2 from 1994 to 1999, the series moved to Amusement Vision with Virtua Striker 3, but it later moved to Sega Sports Design R&D Dept. with Virtua Striker 4.

The original Virtua Striker, released in 1994, was the first association football game to use 3D computer graphics, and was also notable for its early use of texture mapping, along with Sega's own racing video game Daytona USA. Sega advertised the game as "the first three-dimensional computer graphic soccer game".

Only two games in the series have been released on home consoles - Virtua Striker 2 (ver. 2000.1) for the Sega Dreamcast, and Virtua Striker 3 for the GameCube.

History
The main arcade series includes:
 Virtua Striker (1995)
 Virtua Striker 2 (1997)
 Virtua Striker 2 ver. '98 (update, 1998)
 Virtua Striker 2 ver. '99 (update, 1998)
 Virtua Striker 2 ver. '99.1 (update, 1998)
 Virtua Striker 2 ver. 2000 (update, 1999)
 Virtua Striker 2 ver. 2000.1 (Sega Dreamcast port; December 1999; titled Virtua Striker 2 in North America)
 Virtua Striker 3 (2001) Virtua Striker 3 ver. 2002 (Nintendo GameCube port; February 2002; titled Virtua Striker 2002 in North America)
 Virtua Striker 2002 (2002)
 Virtua Striker 4 (2004)
 Virtua Striker 4 ver. 2006 (2006)

The original Virtua Striker game received Xbox 360 and PlayStation 3 ports, distributed respectively through Xbox Live Arcade and PlayStation Network, in February 2013, exclusively for Japan.

Overview
The original Virtua Striker used Sega's Sega Model 2 hardware. The Virtua Striker 2 series run on Sega Model 3, with the exception of Virtua Striker 2 ver. 2000, which appeared on the Dreamcast-based NAOMI system. Virtua Striker 3 was released for the NAOMI 2; subsequent installments (Virtua Striker 2002 and Virtua Striker 4) used the GameCube-based Triforce hardware. Virtua Striker 4 added a card system and mobile phone syncing, allowing players to configure strategies and formations on the move.

The game consists of a single-elimination knock-out tournament with 16 teams (like in the knock-out stage of the FIFA World Cup), with each match lasting two minutes by default, plus injury time and, if the match ends in a draw, one extra minute of sudden death. If the draw persists, penalty shootouts are used to decide the winner. In the console versions and Virtua Striker 4, matches are divided in two halves of one and a half minute each, with substitutions allowed at half time. Virtua Striker 4 also adds a qualifying match, which grants access to the tournament proper if won.

The game operates with three buttons: one for passing (which is also used for sliding tackles when not in possession of the ball), one for long balls (which automatically crosses if the player is running parallel to the box) and one for shots, which can be charged or, if the player is on the receiving end of a cross, tapped for a header or volley finish. The Start button is used to alternate between each team's two available tactical schemes before and during a match (except for the first game, which had no such mechanic, as each team came with its own preset formation) - while each has an offensive or defensive mentality, the formation of choice before kick-off will influence in which formation the team will adopt a neutral mentality. Virtua Striker 4 also added a sprint button.

The series has been ported to consoles on two occasions: Virtua Striker 2 to the Dreamcast (released in Japan and Europe as Virtua Striker 2 ver. 2000.1) and Virtua Striker 2002 to the GameCube (released in Japan and Europe as Virtua Striker 3 ver. 2002). Virtua Striker was also featured as a minigame in Sega's PlayStation 2 EyeToy-based game, Sega Superstars.

The first three games of the series (counting also the Virtua Striker 2 revisions, but not the 2002 revision of Virtua Striker 3) feature a hidden team called FC Sega, made up of the game's developing staff, which always faces the player's team in special matches after the player wins the final match, and can be selected through a special cheat code.Virtua Striker 2 features two other hidden teams in addition to FC Sega: MVP Yukichan and MVP Royal Genki (exclusive to Version 2000.1), both of which consist of strange, cartoonish characters. The original team selection BGM from the first game also exists, and can be heard through a special code.

In Virtua Striker 3 and the GameCube port, ver. 2002, there is an unlockable team called FC Sonic. This team is made up of Sonic, Tails, Knuckles, Amy, Dr. Eggman (who plays as the goalkeeper), four Neutral Chao, a Dark Chao, and a Hero Chao, and has Sonic's creator, Yuji Naka, as manager.Virtua Striker 4 was released on the Triforce arcade platform in 2005, and was updated in 2006. It had online play with ALL.Net.

Gameplay
There are 18 teams available to choose from before the start.
 
It plays with the formation 3-5-2. Recognizable players: Peter Schmeichel, Brian Laudrup and Michael Laudrup.
 
It plays with the formation 4-3-3. Recognizable players: David Platt.
 
It plays with the formation 4-5-1. Recognizable players: Marcel Desailly, David Ginola and Eric Cantona.
 
It plays with the formation 4-5-1. Recognizable players: Andoni Zubizarreta, Julen Guerrero and José Luis Caminero.
 
It plays with the formation 4-4-2 double volante. Recognizable players: Franco Baresi, Paolo Maldini and Roberto Baggio.
 
It plays with the formation 3-5-2.
 
It plays with the formation 4-4-2 double volante. Recognizable players: Thomas Ravelli, Tomas Brolin and Martin Dahlin.
 
It plays with the formation 5-3-2. Recognizable players: Andreas Brehme, Lothar Matthäus and Jürgen Klinsmann.
 
It plays with the formation 3-4-3. Recognizable players: Ed de Goey and Ruud Gullit.
 
It plays with the formation 4-3-3. Recognizable players: Emil Kostadinov, Yordan Letchkov and Hristo Stoichkov.
 
It plays with the formation 3-4-3. 
 
It plays with the formation 3-5-2. 
 
It plays with the formation 4-4-2 double volante. R
 
It plays with the formation 5-3-2. Recognizable players: Tony Meola and Marcelo Balboa.
 
It plays with the formation 4-3-3. Recognizable players: Jorge Campos.
 
It plays with the formation 4-4-2 diamond. Recognizable players: René Higuita, Leonel Álvarez and Carlos Valderrama.
 
It plays with the formation 4-4-2 double volante. Recognizable players: Cláudio Taffarel, Bebeto and Romário.
 
It plays with the formation 4-4-2 diamond. Recognizable players: Fernando Redondo, Diego Maradona, Claudio Caniggia and Gabriel Batistuta.
 F.C. Sega (hidden team)It plays with the formation 4-4-2 double volante.

Reception
In Japan, Game Machine listed Virtua Striker on their July 15, 1995 issue as being both the second most-successful arcade game and the most-successful dedicated arcade game of the month.

A critic for Next Generation applauded the original Virtua Striker as both "excellent to play and watch". He cited the smooth and accurate control, realistic player moves, camera which consistently zooms in or out to the perfect frame at every moment of play, "gorgeous" texture-mapped players and backgrounds, and realistically strong defense. He gave it four out of five stars.Virtua Striker 2 was a major arcade hit in Japan, where it became the second highest-grossing arcade game of 1998, below Tekken 3''.

See also
Virtua Pro Football

Notes

References

External links

Virtua Striker Manual

1994 video games
1997 video games
1998 video games
1999 video games
2000 video games
2001 video games
2002 video games
2005 video games
2006 video games
Amusement Vision games
Arcade video games
Arcade-only video games
Sega Games franchises
Dreamcast games
GameCube games
Association football video games
Sega-AM2 games
Sega arcade games
Video games designed by Yu Suzuki
Video games developed in Japan
Video game franchises
Video game franchises introduced in 1994